Bachirou Salou (born 15 September 1970 in Lomé) is a retired footballer who played as a centre forward in the German Bundesliga.

He possessed double nationality and is living in Germany together with his family, where he bought a house. Bachirou Salou has Nago- Benino roots. Rafiou Moutairou and Tadjou Salou are his siblings.

Club career

Borussia Mönchengladbach
Born in Lomé, Salou was spotted at the age of 19 by former Czechoslovakian international Anton Ondruš, who was on holiday in Cameroon and saw the player appear for Panthère Sportive . Knowing that the Club Borussia Mönchengladbach was looking for a striker, he conveyed him. Shortly afterwards Salou was invited to Germany. In 1990 he began to play as a striker for Borussia Mönchengladbach, where he quickly became a fan favourite.

In his time at Mönchengladbach, Salou helped the team win the 1995 DFB- Pokal, scoring 14 goals in 97 competitive games. In the 1993–94 season he netted five times in only nine contests.

Duisburg
In 1995 Salou moved to the second division with MSV Duisburg, winning promotion in his first year and experiencing his best years in the country overall, as he added 18 goals in the next two top flight seasons combined. His steady performances earned him many offers. FC Bayern München, Fenerbahce S.K. and Borussia Dortmund were some of these clubs. After all he chose to stay in Germany and transferred to former Champions League winner Borussia Dortmund.

He also became a fan favourite in MSV Duisburg. The legendary DFB Cup final in 1997–98 season against FC Bayern München made Salou become a living legend in Duisburg. To this day, he is celebrated in Duisburg. Salou was perpetuate as a living legend in the stadium of MSV Duisburg with his picture.

Frankfurt and Hansa Rostock
After another solid year with Eintracht Frankfurt, Salou joined FC Hansa Rostock in January 2001.

Later career
After a brief time in Belgium, with K.A.S Eupen, Salou returned to Germany in January 2004 and signed with Alemannia Aachen. He played 15 years in both major levels of German football, totalling exactly 300 games and 62 goals.

International career
Salou gained 38 caps for Togo during a nine-year span, making his international debut at age 19. He retired from football the year before the nation reached its first ever FIFA World Cup.

Personal life

Nowadays Salou lives near Mönchengladbach, during the World cup in year 2006 he worked as team manager for the Togolese National team.
He is also related to Tadjou Salou and Rafiou Moutairou.

After retiring, Salou became involved with the initiative Go for Children – Momentum for Change!, as an ambassador.

His son Mamoudou Salou, who was born in 1989, also plays soccer as a striker for SV Uedesheim.

Honours
Borussia Mönchengladbach
DFB-Pokal: 1994–95; Runner-up 1991–92

MSV Duisburg
DFB-Pokal Runner-up: 1997–98

Alemannia Aachen
DFB-Pokal Runner-up: 2003–04

References

External links

Eintracht archives 

1970 births
Living people
Sportspeople from Lomé
Togolese emigrants to Germany
Togolese footballers
Association football forwards
Bundesliga players
2. Bundesliga players
Borussia Mönchengladbach players
MSV Duisburg players
Borussia Dortmund players
Eintracht Frankfurt players
FC Hansa Rostock players
Alemannia Aachen players
Challenger Pro League players
K.A.S. Eupen players
Togo international footballers
1998 African Cup of Nations players
2000 African Cup of Nations players
Togolese expatriate footballers
Expatriate footballers in Cameroon
Expatriate footballers in Germany
Expatriate footballers in Belgium
Togolese expatriate sportspeople in Belgium
Togolese expatriate sportspeople in Germany
Togolese expatriate sportspeople in Cameroon